Syrianochori is a village located in the Nicosia District of Cyprus. On aDe facto basis, it is under the control of Northern Cyprus.

References

Communities in Nicosia District
Populated places in Güzelyurt District